The key worm eel, Ahlia egmontis, is a species of eel in the family Ophichthidae.  It is the only member of its genus.  It is found in the western Atlantic Ocean from Canada through the Gulf of Mexico and the Caribbean islands to Brazil in reef environments.

References

External links
 

Ophichthidae
Fish described in 1884
Taxa named by David Starr Jordan